William Conover may refer to:

 William Sheldrick Conover (born 1928), U.S. Representative from Pennsylvania
 William B. Conover (1865–1947), American politician in Monmouth County, New Jersey